The 1993 South Australian state election was held on 11 December 1993.

Defections, redistributions and seat changes
Hartley Labor MHA Terry Groom resigned from the party in 1991 after losing preselection to contest the seat of Napier at the 1993 election. Elizabeth Independent MHA Martyn Evans was admitted to the Labor Party and endorsed as a candidate in late 1993.

A redistribution was completed in 1991, incorporating changes to the Constitution instituted by referendum requiring the electoral map to be drawn with an eye to ensuring the seat result reflected the statewide vote. The Labor seats of Albert Park, Baudin, Briggs, Gilles, Henley Beach, Stuart, Todd, Walsh and Whyalla; the Liberal seats of Alexandra, Hayward, Mount Gambier, Mitcham, Murray-Mallee and Victoria; and the Independent-held seat of Semaphore were abolished. The redistribution created the notionally Labor seats of Elder, Giles, Hart, Kaurna, Lee, Reynell, Taylor, Torrens and Wright; and the notionally Liberal seats of Colton, Finniss, Frome, Gordon, MacKillop, Ridley and Waite. The Labor seat of Hartley became notionally Liberal, while the Liberal seats of Hanson and Newland became notionally Labor.
Albert Park Labor MHA Kevin Hamilton contested Lee.
Alexandra Liberal MHA Dean Brown contested Finniss.
Briggs Labor MHA Mike Rann contested Ramsay.
Hanson Liberal MHA Heini Becker contested Peake.
Hartley Labor-turned-Independent MHA Terry Groom contested Napier.
Hayward Liberal MHA Mark Brindal contested Unley.
Henley Beach Labor MHA Don Ferguson contested the Legislative Council.
Mawson Labor MHA Susan Lenehan contested Reynell.
Mitcham Liberal MHA Stephen Baker contested Waite.
Mitchell Labor MHA Paul Holloway contested Elder.
Mount Gambier Liberal MHA Harold Allison contested Gordon.
Murray-Mallee Liberal MHA Peter Lewis contested Ridley.
Ramsay Labor MHA Lynn Arnold contested Taylor.
Semaphore Independent MHA Norm Peterson contested the Legislative Council.
Stuart Labor MHA Colleen Hutchison contested Eyre.
Todd Labor MHA John Klunder contested Torrens.
Victoria Liberal MHA Dale Baker contested MacKillop.
Walsh Labor MHA John Trainer contested Hanson.
Whyalla Labor MHA Frank Blevins contested Giles.
Democrats MLC Mike Elliott contested Davenport. His fellow Democrats MLC, Ian Gilfillan, who was not up for re-election, resigned his seat to contest Norwood.

Retiring Members
 Liberal MLC John Burdett died a few weeks before the election.

Labor
John Bannon MHA (Ross Smith)
Terry Hemmings MHA (Napier)
Don Hopgood MHA (Baudin)
Colin McKee MHA (Gilles)
Gordon Bruce MLC

Liberal
Peter Arnold MHA (Chaffey)
Jennifer Cashmore MHA (Coles)
Bruce Eastick MHA (Light)
Stan Evans MHA (Davenport)
Robert Ritson MLC

House of Assembly
Sitting members are shown in bold text. Successful candidates are highlighted in the relevant colour. Where there is possible confusion, an asterisk (*) is also used.

Legislative Council
Sitting members are shown in bold text. Tickets that elected at least one MLC are highlighted in the relevant colour. Successful candidates are identified by an asterisk (*). Eleven seats were up for election. Labor were defending five seats. The Liberals were defending five seats. The Democrats were defending one seat.

References
Antony Green - South Australian state election 1993

Candidates for South Australian state elections
1990s in South Australia
1993 elections in Australia